Quri Chay-ye Sharqi Rural District is in the Central District of Charuymaq County, East Azerbaijan province, Iran. At the National Census of 2006, its population was 2,631 in 520 households. There were 2,457 inhabitants in 667 households at the following census of 2011. At the most recent census of 2016, the population of the rural district was 2,176 in 691 households. The largest of its 22 villages was Agh Ziarat, with 317 people.

References 

Charuymaq County

Rural Districts of East Azerbaijan Province

Populated places in East Azerbaijan Province

Populated places in Charuymaq County